Vache I was the second Arsacid ruler of Caucasian Albania from approximately 336 to 350. He was succeeded by Urnayr.

References

Sources 
 
  

Arsacid kings of Caucasian Albania
3rd-century Iranian people